Gaustadalléen is a tram stop on the Ullevål Hageby Line of the Oslo Tramway. It is located where the road Gaustadalléen passes under Ring 3 in Gaustad in Oslo, Norway.

The station opened on 1 June 1999 as part of the extension of the Ullevål Hageby Line to Rikshospitalet. It is served by line 17 and 18, using SL95 low-floor trams, giving the station step-free access to the vehicles.

References

Oslo Tramway stations in Oslo
Railway stations opened in 1999
1999 establishments in Norway